Mother Seton House is a historic home located on the grounds of St. Mary’s Seminary at Baltimore, Maryland, United States. It is a -story red brick house, similar to other small homes built in the early 19th century for the predominantly French community nearby.  It was built in 1808 as the home of Elizabeth Ann Seton (1774–1821), the first American-born woman beatified and canonized by the Roman Catholic Church.  In the 1960s it was restored to its original appearance through the efforts of a committee, which continues to operate the home as a museum.  Mother Seton House is located adjacent to the St. Mary's Seminary Chapel.

In 1972, Mother Seton House was listed on the National Register of Historic Places.

Mother Seton’s connection

This home on North Paca Street is most well known for its first owner, Mother Seton. She would arrive to the home in Baltimore on June 16, 1808, and stay until June 21, 1809. During her brief year in Baltimore, Seton would pay rent totaling at $250.00. Upon her arrival to the home, Elizabeth Seton was more than pleased with the house. In fact, she penned a letter to a friend, Julia Scott, describing it as a "‘neat, delightful mansion, entirely new...in the new French style of folding windows and recesses.’" Despite the fact that Elizabeth Seton only inhabited the home for a year, a long-lasting bond between the two was formed.

House description

Prior to the home’s existence, the land was occupied by French immigrants. They used the land mainly for tobacco and wheat farming. The house was constructed during the Federal Period roughly around 1807. Although the architect of the original home is unknown, it is believed that Maximilian Godefroy was the mastermind behind the project. He was responsible for much of the designs in the surrounding buildings. Inspiration for the home was drawn from the French immigrants in what is to be known as "Federal Architecture." As it stands, the row-home is located within St. Mary’s Park, just minutes from Downtown Baltimore. The most notable feature about the home is the 26’ wide and 42’ deep staircase that can be seen from the entrance. The house contains at least three bedrooms on the second floor, but there is no total room count for the entire property.

Reason it was built

Elizabeth Seton voiced to Bishop Carroll her wishes to reunite with her children. In an agreement formulated; Bishop Carroll would send her sons down to Baltimore, suggesting that they enroll in school at St. Mary’s College. Fortunately, the bishop himself was the president of the college; therefore he could see that her sons were admitted. The only condition that Elizabeth Seton had to follow was to "establish a school for young girls." This was to be a boarding school which welcomed girls of all ages. This was the first instance of pioneering Catholic education in the United States. The school was funded and developed through the Daughters of Charity.

After Mother Seton

After Mother Seton’s departure to Emmitsburg, Maryland in the summer of 1809, the house was left vacant for some time. This property served for a variety of purposes; in the late 19th century and early 20th century the home was used as a potato bin, and a place of storage and laundry services. After receiving much negative attention for its lack of upkeep, a local women’s group initiated the restoration of the home. The current owner of the property is the Sulpician Order, which also still retains control of St. Mary’s Seminary. In the process of renovation, the house was thoroughly documented by taking photos of both the interior and exterior in order to restore the home to its full originality. At the head of renovation were Mrs. Earnshaw and Mrs. Clinton K. Macsherry with their consultant, John H. Scarff. They furnished the home with decor from the Federal time period. During this time, many were behind the full restoration of this home; in particular, it can be noted that the Order of the Alhambra gave $20,000 for the project.

References

External links

Mother Seton House and St. Mary's Chapel in Baltimore, Maryland: Official website
, including undated photo, at Maryland Historical Trust
Mother Seton House and the St. Mary's Seminary Chapel – Explore Baltimore Heritage

French-American culture in Baltimore
Houses on the National Register of Historic Places in Baltimore
Houses in Baltimore
Houses completed in 1808
Seton
Museums in Baltimore
Historic house museums in Maryland
Religious museums in Maryland
Women's museums in Maryland
Seton Hill, Baltimore
Baltimore City Landmarks